"When I Need You" is a popular song written by Albert Hammond and Carole Bayer Sager. Its first appearance was as the title track of Hammond's 1976 album When I Need You. Leo Sayer's version, produced by Richard Perry, was a massive hit worldwide, reaching number 1 on the UK Singles Chart for three weeks in February 1977 after three of his earlier singles had stalled at number 2.  It also reached number 1 on both the Billboard Hot 100 for a single week in May 1977; and the Hot Adult Contemporary Tracks. Billboard ranked it as the No. 24 song of 1977. Sayer performed it on the second show of the third season of The Muppet Show.

Melody comparison
The melody of the "hook" line, or chorus of "When I Need You" is identical to the part of the Leonard Cohen song "Famous Blue Raincoat", where the lyrics are as follows: "Jane came by with a lock of your hair, she said that you gave it to her that night, that you planned to go clear". The melody of these lyrics matches the lyrics of "When I Need You" as follows: "(When I) need you, I just close my eyes and I'm with you, and all that I so want to give you, is only a heart beat away".

In a 2006 interview with The Globe and Mail Cohen said:

I once had that nicking happen with Leo Sayer. Do you remember that song 'When I Need You'?" Cohen sings the chorus of Sayer's number one hit from 1977, then segues into 'And Jane came by with a lock of your hair', a lyric from 'Famous Blue Raincoat'. 'Somebody sued them on my behalf … and they did settle', even though, he laughs, 'they hired a musicologist, who said, that particular motif was in the public domain and, in fact, could be traced back as far as Schubert.

The same melody can be heard in Elton John's "Little Jeannie" in the lyrics: "Stepped into my life from a bad dream / Making the life that I had seem / Suddenly shiny and new"

Personnel
Leo Sayer – vocals
James Newton Howard – synthesizer
Bobby Keys – saxophone
Michael Omartian – electric piano
Dean Parks – electric guitar
Jeff Porcaro – drums
Willie Weeks – bass

Chart performance

Weekly charts

Year-end charts

Other versions
 The song was covered in Malaysian by Black Dog Bone in 1977 as Bila Rindu.

Rod Stewart version
Rod Stewart recorded the song for his 1996 ballad compilation album If We Fall in Love Tonight. This version was produced by Jimmy Jam and Terry Lewis and was released as the second single from the album, and reached number 55 in Canada.

Celine Dion version
"When I Need You" is a promotional single from Celine Dion's Let's Talk About Love album, released on 7 September 1998 in Brazil only. Entertainment Weekly editor David Browne called the cover, "an obligatory remake (a precisely enunciated version of Leo Sayer's When I Need You)". The New York Observer editor Jonathan Bernstein: "A sliver of redemption is found in the passable version of Leo Sayer's “When I Need You”".

Cliff Richard version
On 29 October 2007, Cliff Richard released "When I Need You" as a single in the UK. It reached number 38 on the UK Singles Chart. It is one of five new recordings on his album Love... The Album.

Tumse Milke
The Indian music composer R.D. Burman used the music of the song for his song, "Tumse Milke", used in the 1989 movie, Parinda.

References

External links
 
 

1976 songs
1977 singles
1998 singles
2007 singles
Billboard Hot 100 number-one singles
Cashbox number-one singles
Celine Dion songs
Cliff Richard songs
European Hot 100 Singles number-one singles
Irish Singles Chart number-one singles
Leo Sayer songs
Pop ballads
Rod Stewart songs
RPM Top Singles number-one singles
Song recordings produced by Jimmy Jam and Terry Lewis
Song recordings produced by Richard Perry
Songs written by Albert Hammond
Songs written by Carole Bayer Sager
UK Singles Chart number-one singles
Warner Records singles
Chrysalis Records singles
Columbia Records singles
Epic Records singles
EMI Records singles